In Greek mythology, Phocus (Ancient Greek: Φῶκος means "seal") was a Corinthian prince who later became the eponymous ruler of Phocis.

Family 
Phocus was the son of King Ornytion (or Ornytus) and grandson of Sisyphus; some called him son of Poseidon. Thus, he might be the same as the son of Poseidon and Pronoe who was referred to in the scholia on Iliad.

Mythology 
Leaving the kingdom of Corinth to his brother Thoas, Phocus led a colony to the region of Tithorea and Mount Parnassus; the land came to be named Phocis after him.

Phocus was said to have cured the wandering Antiope of her madness, which she had been struck with by Dionysus who was outraged by Dirce's death, and to have married her; they were buried in one and the same grave.

Notes

References 

 Pausanias, Description of Greece with an English Translation by W.H.S. Jones, Litt.D., and H.A. Ormerod, M.A., in 4 Volumes. Cambridge, MA, Harvard University Press; London, William Heinemann Ltd. 1918. Online version at the Perseus Digital Library
 Pausanias, Graeciae Descriptio. 3 vols. Leipzig, Teubner. 1903.  Greek text available at the Perseus Digital Library.

Princes in Greek mythology
Kings of Phocis
Kings in Greek mythology
Children of Poseidon
Demigods in classical mythology
Corinthian characters in Greek mythology
Corinthian mythology
Mythology of Phocis